Ethiopic Extended-A is a Unicode block containing Geʽez characters for the Gamo-Gofa-Dawro, Basketo, and Gumuz languages of Ethiopia.

Block

History
The following Unicode-related documents record the purpose and process of defining specific characters in the Ethiopic Extended-A block:

References 

Unicode blocks